George Graham (April 1, 1902 – August 7, 1966) was an Irish-Canadian soccer player who earned one cap with the Canadian national team in 1926.  He played professionally in both Canada and the United States. In 2017, as part of the "Legends Class" he was elected to the Canada Soccer Hall of Fame as a player.

Club
Born in Ireland, Graham's parents moved to Canada when he was fourteen and settled near Edmonton.  Graham worked for the T. Eaton Company and played for the Eaton-sponsored Toronto Ulster United. In 1925, Graham joined Philadelphia Field Club of the American Soccer League.  In 1927, he moved to the Fall River Marksmen, playing thirty league games and scoring seventeen goals.  Near the end of the season, the Marksmen sent Graham to the Brooklyn Wanderers where he scored another two goals in four games.  His combined goals total put him thirteenth on the league's goals table that season.  He then returned to Canada where he spent the remainder of his career with Toronto Ulster United. In 1929, Graham scored in the final as Toronto won the Carls-Rite Cup.

International
On November 6, 1926, Graham scored in Canada's 2–6 away loss to the United States.

Death  
He died on August 7, 1966 at the Queensway General Hospital.

References

External links
 / Canada Soccer Hall of Fame
 

1902 births
1966 deaths
Sportspeople from Derry (city)
American Soccer League (1921–1933) players
Brooklyn Wanderers players
Canadian soccer players
Canadian expatriate soccer players
Canada men's international soccer players
Fall River Marksmen players
Toronto Ulster United players
Canadian National Soccer League players
Irish emigrants to Canada (before 1923)
Date of birth missing
Association football forwards